Gaudium, the Latin word for joy, may refer to:

Gaudium et spes, the Pastoral Constitution on the Church in the Modern World, from the Second Vatican Council
An internal sin, the dwelling with complacency on sins already committed
8061 Gaudium, a minor planet

See also
 Gaudius